Cedric Cornell Tillman is a former professional American football player who played wide receiver for four seasons for the Denver Broncos and Jacksonville Jaguars. He has two sons, Jamir, who played wide receiver at Navy, and Cedric, who plays wide receiver at Tennessee.

References

External links
Just Sports Stats

1970 births
Living people
Sportspeople from Natchez, Mississippi
Players of American football from Mississippi
American football wide receivers
Alcorn State Braves football players
Denver Broncos players
Jacksonville Jaguars players
Las Vegas Outlaws (XFL) players